Applegate Lake is a  reservoir located in the Rogue River–Siskiyou National Forest about  southwest of Medford in the U.S. state of Oregon.

History
The United States Congress authorized construction of the Applegate Dam in 1962 as part of a flood-control project. In 1976, the Corps of Engineers began work on the dam, which was finished in 1980 at a final cost of $96 million dollars. In addition to controlling floods, the dam was intended to store water for irrigation and recreation.

As the reservoir filled with water, it inundated the remnants of Copper, a community that had once had a post office and a few buildings. Since then, when water levels in the lake fall sufficiently, the highway that formerly ended at Copper reappears at the south (upstream) end of the lake and serves as the lower end of a boat ramp. Over 5,000 ounces of gold were recovered in the final two years of construction and proceeds were split between the federal government and two engineering firms involved.

It and Lost Creek Lake, on the main stem of the Rogue River, are the only large multi-purpose Corps of Engineers reservoirs in the Rogue River basin.

The lake, the dam, and other entities in this region were named for Lindsay Applegate. In 1848, he led a party of settlers through the Rogue River Valley on the way to mines in California.

Recreation
 Applegate Lake has large populations of trout, landlocked Chinook salmon, smallmouth bass, largemouth bass, and crappie. It is stocked each year with about 120,000 rainbow trout and about 50,000 young Chinook. Ramps, including two that are open year-round, provide access for boats. About  of trails circle the reservoir.

The United States Forest Service maintains campgrounds as well as places along the shore for fishing, picnicking, and swimming as well as boating. Mountain biking is allowed on one of the trails, and horses are allowed on three.

See also
 List of lakes in Oregon

References

Reservoirs in Oregon
Rogue River (Oregon)
Lakes of Jackson County, Oregon
Rogue River-Siskiyou National Forest
Protected areas of Jackson County, Oregon
Dams in Oregon
Buildings and structures in Jackson County, Oregon
United States Army Corps of Engineers dams
Dams completed in 1980
1980 establishments in Oregon